Klosters Platz railway station station (formerly Klosters railway station) is located in the municipality of Klosters-Serneus in the district of Prattigau/Davos in the Swiss canton of Graubünden. It is the main Rhaetian station in the village of Klosters on the Landquart–Davos Platz railway (not to be confused with the second station in Klosters on this line, the smaller Klosters Dorf railway station) and is the northern end of the Vereina Tunnel.

Services
The following services stop at Klosters Platz:

 RegioExpress:
 Hourly service between Disentis/Mustér and Scuol-Tarasp.
 Hourly service between Landquart and St. Moritz.
 Hourly service between Landquart and Davos Platz.
 Regio:
 Limited service to Scuol-Tarasp.
 Limited service between Landquart and Davos Platz.

References

External links
 
 
 

Railway stations in Graubünden
Rhaetian Railway stations
Klosters-Serneus
Railway stations in Switzerland opened in 1889